Mohammad Mo'men Khan Shamlu, was a Turkoman nobleman from the Shamlu tribe, who served as the vizier of the Safavid king (shah) Sultan Husayn (r. 1694–1722) from 1699 to 1707. He had a son named Mohammad Qoli Khan Shamlu.

Sources 
 
 

Grand viziers of the Safavid Empire
Iranian Turkmen people
17th-century births
18th-century deaths

Year of death unknown
Shamlu
17th-century people of Safavid Iran
18th-century people of Safavid Iran